This is a list of major companies based in metropolitan Copenhagen, Denmark.

List

See also
 List of companies of Denmark

References

See also
 2014 Berlingske Gold 1000

 
Economy of Copenhagen
Copenhagen-related lists